D'Agostino is an Italian surname. Notable people with the surname include:

 Abbey D'Agostino (born 1992), American athlete
 Antonino D'Agostino (born 1978), Italian footballer
 Colleen D'Agostino, American musician and singer-songwriter
 Francesco D'Agostino (born 1946), Italian jurist 
 Frank D'Agostino (1934–1997), American football player
 Gaetano D'Agostino (born 1982), Italian footballer
 Gigi D'Agostino (born 1967), Italian DJ
 Jeff D'Agostino (born 1982), American actor
 John D'Agostino (financial services), American businessman and developer of commodity exchanges
 John D'Agostino (poker player) (born 1982), American professional poker player
 Jon D'Agostino (1929–2010), American comic book artist
 Nicholas D'Agostino (born 1989), American motivational speaker
 Nicholas D'Agostino (soccer) (born 1998), Australian professional footballer 
 Nicholas D'Agostino Sr. (1910–1996), co-founder of D'Agostino Supermarkets
 Oscar D'Agostino (1901–1975) Italian chemist, collaborator of Enrico Fermi
 Peppino D'Agostino (born 1956), Italian musician
 Rebecca D'Agostino (born 1982), Maltese footballer
 Ralph B. D'Agostino (born 1940), American statistician

See also
D'Agostini
D'Agostino (disambiguation)

References

Italian-language surnames